Ships named SS St. Louis include:

 , a diesel-powered passenger ship sometimes referred to as "SS St. Louis"; built in 1925 by Bremer Vulkan for the Hamburg America Line. It carried Jewish refugees from Nazi Germany in 1939 in an unsuccessful emigration attempt; scrapped in Hamburg in 1952
 , a passenger steamer built by William Cramp & Sons of Philadelphia for the American Line; became USS St. Louis during Spanish–American War, and USS Louisville (SP-1644) during World War I; burned and sank at Hoboken, New Jersey in 1920; scrapped in Italy in 1925
 , an 18,362-gross register ton container ship of Sea-Land Service active until 1988; an enlarged and rebuilt ship created from the former USS General M. L. Hersey (AP-148), a World War II transport ship of the United States Navy

See also
 , the name of several United States Navy ships